

History 

Ananda Sastralaya National School Matugama is a school in Sri Lanka. It was established on 22 February 1942 by Dayasena Turnolius Pasqual, the founder of Matugama Ananda Sastralaya. He later became a parliamentarian and also a deputy minister. This school was established due to the prevailing war situation in Colombo City during World War II. At that time schools were closed in Colombo. Kotte Ananda Sastralaya was also closed due to the war situation and it was converted into an army camp. Eleven students from Matugama attended Kotte Ananda Sastralaya. Most of them were from Pasqual families. They had to come back as their school was closed. Daya T. Pasqual was among them. At that time he was a teacher. He decided to start a branch of Kotte Ananda Sastralaya in Matugama. His uncle Brampi Pasqual, Munasinghe, Wijegunawardanea and Dr E. W. Adikaram, principal of Kotte Ananda Sastralaya, helped him to start this school.

In the evening of 22 February 1942 Hon. Minister of Education C.W.W. Kannangara was the chief guest of the opening ceremony at Sri Sudarshanaramaya temple Matugama. Dr E.W.Adikaram also attended the ceremony.

At the beginning there were eleven students and three teachers in the school. Pasqual was also among them. School manager was Brumpy Pasqual.

Houses 
All the students of Ananda Sastralaya are divided into four houses. Those are:
Anura
Colour -  Purple	
Vijitha
Colour -  Blue
Tissa
Colour -  Green
Rohana
Colour -  Yellow

Notable alumni
Below is a list of notable alumni of Ananda Sastralaya, Matugama

Website

References 

Buddhist schools in Sri Lanka
National schools in Sri Lanka
Buildings and structures in Matugama
Schools in Kalutara District